Väljataguse may refer to several places in Estonia:

Väljataguse, Järva County, a village in Väätsa Parish, Järva County
Väljataguse, Jõgeva County, a village in Pajusi Parish, Jõgeva County
Väljataguse, Rapla County, a village in Rapla Parish, Rapla County